S. A. Cosby (Shawn Andre Cosby - born 4 August 1973 at Newport News, VA) is a "Southern noir" crime fiction writer. He resides in Gloucester, Virginia, on the Chesapeake Bay. Cosby has published three crime novels: My Darkest Prayer, Blacktop Wasteland, and Razorblade Tears. A fourth novel, All the Sinners Bleed, is expected to release in June 2023, in hardback form, and published, like its two successors, by Flatiron Books, an imprint of Macmillan.

Awards and accolades
Cosby's latest novel, Razorblade Tears, debuted number 10 on the New York Times bestseller list.

His previous novel, Blacktop Wasteland "...won a landslide of awards, including a Los Angeles Times Book Prize in 2020." It also was chosen as a 2020 New York Times Notable Book and charted at number 22 on that list. Additionally, Blacktop Wasteland is a 2021 Anthony Awards winner. The International Thriller Writers, an association spanning 49 countries, with a membership of 4,500 authors of the genre, "...named Cosby’s novel Blacktop Wasteland the Best Hard Cover Fiction Novel of 2021."

Both novels have been optioned for films. Jerry Bruckheimer's company "was among the group that won the film rights in an auction" for Razorblade Tears. Razorblade Tears was also featured on Jimmy Fallon's The Tonight Show for Fallon's 2021 Summer Reads Book Club. The book was one of six contenders for a Jimmy Fallon read.

Bibliography

References

External links
S. A. Cosby at Macmillan
S. A. Cosby, Pain is Universal – That's What Binds all of Crime Fiction Together", CrimeReads, July 21, 2020
"Interview With an Author: S.A. Cosby". Los Angeles Public Library.

 

21st-century American novelists
21st-century American short story writers
American mystery writers
21st-century African-American writers
Living people
Year of birth missing (living people)